The 2016 Brisbane International was a tournament of the 2016 ATP World Tour and 2016 WTA Tour. It was played on outdoor hard courts in Brisbane, Queensland, Australia. It was the eighth edition of the tournament and took place at the Queensland Tennis Centre in Tennyson. It was held from 3 to 10 January 2016 as part of the Australian Open Series in preparation for the first Grand Slam of the year.

Points and prize money

Point distribution

Prize money 

1Qualifiers prize money is also the Round of 32 prize money.
*per team

ATP singles main-draw entrants

Seeds 

1 Rankings as of December 28, 2015.

Other entrants 
The following players received wildcards into the singles main draw:
  Ben Mitchell
  James Duckworth 
  John-Patrick Smith

The following player received entry using a protected ranking into the singles main draw:
  Radek Štěpánek

The following players received entry from the qualifying draw:
  Oliver Anderson
  Ivan Dodig
  Tobias Kamke
  Yoshihito Nishioka

Withdrawals
Before the tournament
  Jerzy Janowicz → replaced by  Dušan Lajović
  Sam Querrey → replaced by   Lucas Pouille

ATP doubles main-draw entrants

Seeds 

1 Rankings as of December 28, 2015.

Other entrants 
The following pairs received wildcards into the doubles main draw:
  James Duckworth /  Chris Guccione
  Matt Reid /  John-Patrick Smith

Withdrawals 
During the tournament
  Grigor Dimitrov (shoulder soreness)

WTA singles main-draw entrants

Seeds 

1 Rankings as of December 28, 2015.

Other entrants 
The following players received wildcards into the singles main draw:
  Priscilla Hon 
  Ajla Tomljanović

The following players received entry from the qualifying draw:
  Kateryna Bondarenko
  Jana Čepelová
  Samantha Crawford
  Elena Vesnina

The following players received entry as lucky losers:
  Ysaline Bonaventure
  Margarita Gasparyan

Withdrawals 
Before the tournament
  Simona Halep (Left leg injury) → replaced by  Ysaline Bonaventure
  Maria Sharapova (Left forearm injury) → replaced by  Margarita Gasparyan

Retirements 
  Garbiñe Muguruza (Left foot injury)

WTA doubles main-draw entrants

Seeds 

1 Rankings as of December 28, 2015.

Other entrants 
The following pairs received wildcards into the doubles main draw:
  Priscilla Hon /  Ajla Tomljanović
  Angelique Kerber /  Andrea Petkovic
The following pair received entry as alternates:
  Shahar Pe'er /  Maria Sanchez

Withdrawals 
Before the tournament
  Ajla Tomljanović (abdominal injury)

Champions

Men's singles 

  Milos Raonic def.  Roger Federer, 6–4, 6–4

Women's singles 

  Victoria Azarenka def.  Angelique Kerber 6–3, 6–1

Men's doubles 

  Henri Kontinen /  John Peers def.  James Duckworth /  Chris Guccione, 7–6(7–4), 6–1

Women's doubles 

  Martina Hingis /  Sania Mirza def.  Angelique Kerber /  Andrea Petkovic, 7–5, 6–1

Broadcast
Selected matches aired in Australia on 7Two, with live coverage of both day and night sessions. Every match was also available to be streamed live through a free 7Tennis mobile app.

References

External links 
 

 
2016